Oleg Soldatov (Russian: Олег Юрьевич Солдатов; born 9 January 1963) is a Russian conductor.

Life 
Soldatov studied at the Saint Petersburg Conservatory and received his diploma in 1986. From 1990 to 1991 he was the artistic director of the Tomsk Symphony Orchestra, from 1992 to 2006 he headed the Symphony Orchestra of the Karelian Philharmony. Since 1996 he became the chief conductor of the Sochi Symphony Orchestra.

Awards 
 Award of the Government of the Russian Federation in the field of culture (2005)

References

External links 
 Oleg Soldatov. Interview on Kultura-Portal, October 2003. (Russian)

21st-century Russian conductors (music)
Russian male conductors (music)
21st-century Russian male musicians
Artistic directors (music)
1963 births
Living people